Kai Jacobs (born 15 December 1995) is an Antiguan footballer who plays as a forward for the Antigua and Barbuda women's national team.

Early life
Jacobs has attended the St. Anthony's Secondary School in Cedar Grove, Antigua.

College career
Jacobs attended the Bryant & Stratton College in the United States.

International career
Jacobs represented Antigua and Barbuda at the 2012 CONCACAF Women's U-17 Championship qualification and the 2012 CONCACAF Women's U-20 Championship qualification. She capped at senior level during two CONCACAF W Championship qualifications (2010 and 2022) and the 2020 CONCACAF Women's Olympic Qualifying Championship qualification.

References

External links

1995 births
Living people
Antigua and Barbuda women's footballers
Women's association football forwards
College women's soccer players in the United States
Antigua and Barbuda women's international footballers
Antigua and Barbuda expatriate footballers
Antigua and Barbuda expatriate sportspeople in the United States
Expatriate women's soccer players in the United States